Umbelebele Jomo Cosmos FC is a Swazi soccer club based in Mbabane. They play in the Swazi First Division.

Stadium
Currently the team plays at the 1000 capacity Prince of Wales Stadium.

References

External links
Soccerway

Football clubs in Eswatini
Mbabane